This is a list of Belgian television related events from 2003.

Events
3 January - The Belgian version of Pop Idol debuts on VTM.
9 May - Peter Evrard wins the first season of Idool.
May - Release date of Peter Evrard's debut single, "For You".
20 September - Heidi Zutterman, who finished 5th in the third season of Big Brother wins Big Brother All-Stars.
14 December - Kristof van Camp wins the fourth season of Big Brother.

Debuts
3 January - Idool (2003-2011)

Television shows

1990s
Samson en Gert (1990–present)
Familie (1991–present)
Wittekerke (1993-2008)
Thuis (1995–present)
Wizzy & Woppy (1999-2007)

2000s
Big Brother (2000-2007)

Ending this year
Big & Betsy (2000-2003)

Births

Deaths

See also
2003 in Belgium